William Douglas, 1st Duke of Queensberry PC (163728 March 1695), also 3rd Earl of Queensberry and 1st Marquess of Queensberry, was a Scottish politician.

He was the son of James Douglas, 2nd Earl of Queensberry and his second wife Margaret Stewart, daughter of John Stewart, 1st Earl of Traquair. He succeeded his father as Earl of Queensberry in 1671 and took his seat in the Parliament of Scotland on 12 June 1672.

Career

He was appointed a Scottish Privy Councillor in 1667, Lord Justice General from 1680 to 1682, and Lord High Treasurer of Scotland from 1682 to 1686. He was created Marquess of Queensberry on 11 February 1682 and Duke of Queensberry on 3 November 1684, with remainder to his heirs male. He refused to support James VII's measures against the established church in 1685. He was Lord President of the Privy Council from 1686 to 1689. From 1685 he was one of the lords of the Privy Council for both Scotland and England, but in 1687 he was accused of maladministration by James Drummond, 4th Earl of Perth and was stripped of his appointments.

He assented to the accession of William and Mary and again enjoyed the royal favour before he died, being appointed Extraordinary Lord of Session in 1693.

He acquired what is now known as Queensberry House on the Royal Mile in 1689 and died there.

Personal life
He married Lady Isabel Douglas, daughter of William Douglas, 1st Marquess of Douglas and Lady Mary Gordon, in 1657, and they had issue:
Lady Anne Douglas, Countess of Wemyss (died from injuries following her clothes going on fire, 23 February 1700)
James Douglas, 2nd Duke of Queensberry (1662–1711)
William Douglas, 1st Earl of March (died 9 September 1705)
George Douglas

References

1637 births
1695 deaths
101
Marquesses of Queensberry
William Douglas, 1st Duke of Queensberry
Members of the Privy Council of England
Members of the Privy Council of Scotland
Presidents of the Privy Council of Scotland
Lords Justice-General
Lords High Commissioner to the Parliament of Scotland
Lord High Treasurers of Scotland
Members of the Parliament of Scotland 1669–1674
Members of the Convention of the Estates of Scotland 1678
Members of the Parliament of Scotland 1681–1682
Members of the Parliament of Scotland 1685–1686
Members of the Convention of the Estates of Scotland 1689
Members of the Parliament of Scotland 1689–1702
Commissioners of the Treasury of Scotland
Queensbury
Extraordinary Lords of Session